The Canton of Dieppe-Est is a former canton situated in the Seine-Maritime département and in the Haute-Normandie region of northern France. It was disbanded following the French canton reorganisation which came into effect in March 2015. It consisted of 8 communes, which joined the canton of Dieppe-2 in 2015. It had a total of 18,293 inhabitants (2012).

Geography 
A farming, light industry and fishing area in the arrondissement of Dieppe, centred on the port and town of Dieppe.

The canton comprised 8 communes:

Ancourt
Belleville-sur-Mer
Berneval-le-Grand
Bracquemont
Derchigny
Dieppe (partly)
Grèges
Martin-Église

Population

See also 
 Arrondissements of the Seine-Maritime department
 Cantons of the Seine-Maritime department
 Communes of the Seine-Maritime department

References

Dieppe-Est
2015 disestablishments in France
States and territories disestablished in 2015